Australian National Badminton Championships are officially held since the year 1935.  Already eleven years earlier already started the unofficial national championships in Victoria, but a national governing body for badminton was still missing in this time.

Past winners

References
2006

Badminton in Australia
National badminton championships
Recurring sporting events established in 1935
Badminton